Shabab Al-Khader Sports Club ) is a professional football club based in the town of Al-Khader, within the Bethlehem Governorate in the Palestinian West Bank. The club currently compete in the West Bank Premier League. Shabab Al-Khadr plays out of Al-Khader Stadium.

History
Shabab Al Khadr were founded in 1956.
When their new stadium was inaugurated in 2007, the club played a match against Maccabi Ahi Nazareth, an Israeli Arab team from Nazareth.

Notable players

References

External links
Club profile - Kooora.com

Association football clubs established in 1956

Football clubs in the West Bank